Shabash Vikram ( Bravo Vikram) is a 1985 Indian Kannada-language masala film. The film features Ambareesh and Urvashi in the lead roles with Sathyaraj as Main Antagonist. This is first & only Movie for Tamil actor Sathyaraj in Kannada. It was dubbed in Tamil as Kadamai Enathu Udamai.

Cast
 Ambareesh as Vikram
 Urvashi as Gayathri
 Sathyaraj as Suman
 Silk Smitha 
 Uma Shivakumar 
 M. N. Lakshmi Devi 
 Vedapradha 
 Kamala Murthy 
 Jayasheela 
 Mangala
 Devikarani
 Meenakshi
 Rani
 Mala
 T. N. Balakrishna 
 Thoogudeepa Srinivas 
 Dinesh
 Umesh
 Sudheer
 Shivaprakash 
 Hanumanthachar

References

1985 films
1980s Kannada-language films
1980s masala films
Films scored by G. K. Venkatesh
Films directed by Renuka Sharma